AirScript is a hand-held device which provides theatregoers with subtitles in a variety of languages. 

The device was launched in November 2009 at the musical Hairspray at London's Shaftesbury Theatre. 

The first languages available were  English, Chinese, French, German, Italian, Spanish, and Russian.

References

 AIRSCRIPT: A THEATRICAL BABELFISH.

Stagecraft